The Lights of Home is the third studio album by American country music group Baillie & the Boys. It rose to the number 35 position in the Billboard Country Albums chart in 1990. The singles hits were the number 23 "Perfect," the number 5 "(Now and Then There's) A Fool Such as I" (which was a remake of the classic Elvis Presley standard) and the number 18 "Treat Me Like a Stranger." This was also their first album as a duo, and their final album for RCA Records.

Track listing

Chart performance

Baillie & the Boys albums
1990 albums
RCA Records albums
Albums produced by Kyle Lehning